Soulhead (known as SOULHEAD in Japan) was a Japanese urban contemporary/R&B duo consisting of sisters Yoshika Sawayama (よしか) and Tsugumi Sawayama (つぐみ). Both were born in Hokkaidō; Yoshika was born on July 20, 1978 and Tsugumi was born on January 25, 1981. They worked with several well-known artists, including Sowelu, Koda Kumi, Crystal Kay and Ken Hirai.

Biography
Before they assumed the name Soulhead, Yoshika and Tsugumi were known as Batti Baas. Batti Baas released one vinyl single through Handcuts Records called Lovin' You, which featured Aaron Blackmon. The song was a remake of the Minnie Riperton standard. In February 2002, they released a CD single through Tokuma Japan Communications called Inside Out.

Shortly after the release of Inside Out, they were signed to Sony Music Associated Records and began working under the pseudonym Soulhead. The label sent them one year abroad to Australia and New Zealand to improve their proficiency in English. They released their debut single, Step to the New World, on August 21, 2002. In 2006 they were transferred to Sony Music Associated Records' sublabel, onenation. They appeared on various compilations with other Japanese artists. Soulhead's sound was a blend between various genres, such as soul, hip-hop, R&B, dancehall, reggae and funk, with many of their lyrics in English. They usually worked with the production team known as Octopussy. They also worked on releases with other Japanese artists, such as Kumi Koda and Soul'd Out. Yoshika is also a renowned songwriter, who has worked with artists such as Sowelu, Ken Hirai and Crystal Kay.

On February 21, 2007 they released a greatest hits album called Best of Soulhead, which contained all of their singles released up to Naked, along with a few b-sides. On February 24, 2010, after a four-year hiatus, they released a new album titled Soulhead under Avex Group, which they transferred to from SMEJ. On September 28, 2011, the duo released their second Avex album, Jump Up the Wall. This has been their final release to date.

Yoshika released her first solo album on July 3, 2013, titled My Anthem, which consisted of twelve new songs and one remix. Six months later, she released another album: a remix album compiled of remixes from My Anthem.

As of March 2016, their Avex site was unavailable.

Yoshika is the singer of alternative band Free But Sharp Pain, first formed in 2014. They have released one EP, Fall Into Reverie, in 2022.

Since 2014, Tsugumi performs with fellow rapper Luna as hip hop duo MaryJane, releasing one album called Street Names in 2014 and an EP, Two, in 2016, via Luna's own label Lilbooty Recordings. Tsugumi released her first solo album on May 18, 2016, titled LUVPLATE, on the Lilbooty Recordings label. She released two solo songs in 2019, Nail Gossip and Braid My Hair,  and an EP titled Laid Back in 2021.

Influences
Some musical artists who they respect are Tupac Shakur, Snoop Dogg, The Beatles, Janis Joplin, Takuro Yoshida and Ice Cube.

Personal life
It was announced in their official blog that Yoshika gave birth to a baby. In 2022 she hosted a radio show on FM Karatsu.

Albums

Studio albums
Oh My Sister Rank: #3 / Sold: 214,545
March 5, 2003
BRAIDED Rank: #4 / Sold: 139,992
April 28, 2004
NakedRank: #5
March 8, 2006
SOULHEAD Rank: #40
February 24, 2010
JUMP UP THE WALL Rank: #73 
September 28, 2011

Best albums
BEST OF SOULHEAD Rank: #5
February 21, 2007

Remix albums
RE-CONSTRUCT ALBUM Vol.1 "REFLECTION" Rank: #89 / Sold: 9,602
September 26, 2003
RE-CONSTRUCT ALBUM Vol.2 "CRYSTALLIZED" Rank: #41
June 21, 2006

Yoshika solo albums
MY ANTHEM Rank: #286
July 3, 2013
my anthem -sympathetic resonance-
January 22, 2014

Tsugumi solo albums
LUVPLATE
May 18, 2016
Laid Back EP
September 24, 2021

Singles

Standard singles
(Source)

Lovin' You feat. Aaron Blackmon (BATTI BAAS) 
January 7, 2001
Inside Out (BATTI BAAS)
June 2, 2002
Step to the New World Rank: #24 / Sold: 59,287
July 24, 2002 (12")
August 21, 2002 (CD)
Lover, Knight, Man Rank: #36 / Sold: 18,410
November 20, 2002
Sora Rank: #28 / Sold: 16,035
February 5, 2005
Oh My Sister (Remix)/I'm just going down Rank: #114 / Sold: 2,561
May 2, 2003
Get Up! ep Rank: #28 / Sold: 15,967
July 30, 2003
You Can Do That Rank: #36 / Sold: 18,691
January 21, 2004
No Way Rank: #50 / Sold: 5,353
March 24, 2004
At the Party
June 2, 2004
Fiesta Rank: #35 / Sold: 7,773
May 25, 2005
Sparkle☆Train/Got To Leave Rank: #30 / Sold: 15,324
December 14, 2005
Pray/XXX feat. Koda Kumi Rank: #22 / Sold: 10,109
January 27, 2006
Kimi no Kiseki/Itsumademo... Rank: #56
December 6, 2006
Dear Friends Rank: #60
January 24, 2007

12" Analog singles
(Source)
Too Late [DJ Watarai remix]/Song For You [DJ Hironyc remix]
August 20, 2003
Break Up [DJ Masterkey remix]/Playboy [Saigenji remix]August 20, 2003
To Da Fakes MCs
September 10, 2003
Lover, Knight, Man [D.O.I.+Octopussy remix]/Moon Shine feat. Aaron Blackmon [Doggystyle remix]
September 10, 2003
Sparkle☆Train ~worked by mark de clive-lowe/You can do that ~worked by Reel People
July 13, 2006
XXX ~worked by SA-RA/Pray ~worked by Kenny Dope
July 13, 2006

DVDsOh My Sister LIVE & CLIPSOctober 8, 2003SOULHEAD tour 2006 "Naked"August 9, 20065th Anniversary tour "BEST OF SOULHEAD"November 11, 2007

Collaborative efforts and featured artistRyuusei no Sadoru (流星のサドル / Meteor of the Saddle) (February 25, 2004)
from album SOUL TREE ~a musical tribute to toshinobu kubota~Like a Queen feat. SOULHEAD (February 23, 2005)
from single Like a Queen feat. SOULHEAD / Tomita.Lab D.D.D feat. SOULHEAD (December 21, 2005)
from album BEST ~second session~ / Koda KumiHome party feat. TSUGUMI of SOULHEAD (August 1, 2007)
from album おたくgirlsの宴 / leccaBeauty and the Beast (September 26, 2007)
from album TRIBUTE TO CELINE DIONLove Majic feat. LUNA, TSUGUMI of SOULHEAD & JAMOSA (July 28, 2010)
from album POWER BUTTERFLY / leccaRound Mirror Moon feat. Yoshika (October 2, 2010)
from album 攻め燃える (Burning Attack) / JABBERLOOPNatural High feat. Tsugumi (October 2, 2010)
from album 攻め燃える (Burning Attack) / JABBERLOOPSLOW MOTION feat. TSUGUMI (May 18, 2011)
from album OPEN THE DOOR / HIROKODREAMERS feat. TSUGUMI''' (October 26, 2011)
from album BEHIND the TRUTH'' / NERDHEAD

References

External links
 Soulhead official Avex web site
 Soulhead @ Avex
 Soulhead discography @ Discogs
 Soulhead @ Oricon Style music
 Soulhead @ OikakeNet
 Yoshika official blog

Avex Group artists
Japanese pop music groups
Tokuma Japan Communications artists
People from Ebetsu, Hokkaido